Christine Lee may refer to:

Christine Lee (academic), British academic
Christine Lee (actress), Hong Kong actress
Christine Peng-Peng Lee, Canadian gymnast

See also
Christina Lee, Hong Kong politician
Christina Lee (producer), American producer and screenwriter
Christopher Lee (disambiguation)